My Old Man is a sitcom starring Clive Dunn as retired and embittered engine driver Sam Cobbett. ITV broadcast 13 episodes in two series during 1974 and 1975.

Set in London, Sam Cobbett is the last tenant to leave an old house on a council-condemned road. He goes to live with his daughter, her posh husband (Arthur), and their young teenage son (Ron), in a flat nearby.

Cast
 Clive Dunn as Sam Cobbett
 Priscilla Morgan as Doris
 Edward Hardwicke as Arthur
 Keith Chegwin as Ron
 George Tovey as Willie
 Jon Laurimore as Andrew
 Peter Mayock as Cyril

Production history
The pilot was one of a series of seven one-offs in a BBC Two comedy anthology series called Seven of One (1973). The pilot starred Ronnie Barker with Graham Armitage and Ann Beach, and was produced by Sydney Lotterby and Harold Snoad. 

When the BBC failed to develop Gerald Frow's script into a series, Yorkshire Television stepped in, took over and cast Clive Dunn in the lead part, whilst Ronnie Barker focused on his successful roles in Porridge and Open All Hours.

The location of the main series remained unchanged from the pilot.

Series overview
{| class="wikitable" style="text-align: center;"
|-
! style="padding:0 8px" colspan="2" rowspan="2"| Series
! style="padding:0 8px" rowspan="2"| Episodes
! colspan="2"| Originally aired
! colspan="3"| DVD release date
|-
! Series premiere
! Series finale
! Region 1
! Region 2
! Region 4
|-
 |style="background:#829DDB"| 
 |1
 |7
 |
 |
 |
 |
 |
|-
 |style="background:#A5BBED"| 
 |2
 |6
 |
 |
 |
 |
 |
|}

Notes

External links
 My Old Man at the BFI Film & TV Database
 
 
 My Old Man at Television Heaven

1970s British sitcoms
1974 British television series debuts
1975 British television series endings
ITV sitcoms
Television series by ITV Studios
Television series by Yorkshire Television
Television shows set in Bradford
English-language television shows